Eva Rubinstein (born 1933) is a Polish-American photographer whose artistic works present portraits, nudes and interiors, often taken in Europe as well as the United States.

Early life
Rubinstein was born in Buenos Aires where her mother, the ballerina Nela Młynarska, was accompanying her father, the pianist Arthur Rubinstein, on a concert tour of South America. She was raised in Paris where she began to train as a ballet dancer at the age of five. In 1939, at the beginning of World War II, the family moved to the United States where Eva Rubinstein received American citizenship in 1946. She attended Scripps College in Claremont, California, and studied drama at the University of California, Los Angeles. From 1953, she worked as a dancer and actress in New York, appearing in the original production of "The Diary of Anne Frank.". In 1956, she married William Sloane Coffin and gave birth to three children, Amy, Alexander and David. The marriage ended in divorce in 1968.

Photography
In 1967, Rubinstein became seriously interested in photography, benefitting from workshops with Lisette Model and Diane Arbus. In addition to her work as a photojournalist, she has taken more intimate photographs of people, including nudes, and of (often empty) interiors. In an interview with Frank Horvat, she explained she had always shown great respect for the people she photographed, never wishing to intrude. She has also led workshops at the School of Visual Arts in Manhattan (1972) and at Manhattanville College, among many other venues in the US and Europe. Purchase, New York, (1974-1975).

Exhibitions
Rubinstein's work has been presented at nearly a hundred solo exhibitions worldwide, among them:
1979: Eva Rubinstein: Photographs, Kalamazoo Institute of Arts, Kalamazoo, Michigan
1984: Eva Rubinstein (Polska - USA). Fotografia, Muzeum Sztuki, Łódź, Poland 
1985: Eva Rubinstein, Galerie du Château d'eau, Toulouse, France
2009: Élégies, Galerie In Camera, Paris

References

External links
18 prints from the collection of Eva Rubinstein's work at the Museum of Contemporary Photography, Columbia College, Chicago
Examples of Eva Rubinstein's work from Artnet

American photographers
1933 births
American women photographers
People from Buenos Aires
Living people
Manhattanville College faculty
Scripps College alumni
University of California, Los Angeles alumni
Polish emigrants to the United States
American people of Polish-Jewish descent